Maran also known as Ghilli Maran (4 June 1972 – 12 May 2021) was an Indian actor and singer who primarily featured as a comedian in films.

Personal life

He was born to Naagammal and Nagappan, in Naththam, Chengalpet district. He has 2 sisters and 4 brothers. He was married to Clara Manimaran and the couple have a daughter, Nivya Angel.

Career 
He made his big-screen debut in the 2002 film Ezhumalai, playing a minor role. He then played the role of a kabaddi player in Dharani's directorial Ghilli (2004) which became a box office success. He is known for playing the role of Vijay's friend in the sports drama film. Maran's performance as a henchman in Thalainagaram was also lauded by audience where he featured alongside veteran comedian Vadivelu. He was seen posthumously in  film Sarpatta Parambarai and Anti Indian.

In addition, he had also performed gaana songs at concerts at his home town.

Filmography

All films are in Tamil, unless otherwise noted.

Death 
Maran died on 12 May 2021 at the age of 48 due to COVID-19. He underwent treatment at the Chengalpet Government Hospital where he was hospitalized two days prior to his death.

References 

1972 births
2021 deaths
21st-century Tamil male actors
Indian male comedians
Indian male film actors
Male actors in Tamil cinema
Tamil comedians
Tamil male actors
21st-century Indian male singers
21st-century Indian singers
Indian folk singers
People from Kanchipuram district
Deaths from the COVID-19 pandemic in India